The 2021 Central Connecticut Blue Devils football team represented Central Connecticut State University as a member of the Northeast Conference (NEC) during the 2021 NCAA Division I FCS football season. The Blue Devils, led by third-year head coach Ryan McCarthy, played their home games at Arute Field. Central Connecticut compiled an overall record of 4–7 with a mark of 4–3 in conference play, tying for fourth place in the NEC.

Schedule

References

Central Connecticut
Central Connecticut Blue Devils football seasons
Central Connecticut Blue Devils football